Quentin Jouffroy (born ) is a French male volleyball player. He is part of the France men's national volleyball team. On club level he plays for ASUL Lyon VB.

References

External links
 Profile at FIVB.org

1993 births
Living people
French men's volleyball players
Place of birth missing (living people)
Volleyball players at the 2015 European Games
European Games competitors for France
Mediterranean Games bronze medalists for France
Mediterranean Games medalists in volleyball
Competitors at the 2013 Mediterranean Games